Galera Point is the easternmost point in Trinidad, in the island's far northeast. It is in the county of St David and nearby to the town of Toco.

Geography of Trinidad and Tobago